The 2020 K3 League was the first season of the K3 League as a semi-professional league and the third tier of South Korean football league system. After the 2019 season, the former Korea National League and K3 League Advanced went defunct and rebranded into the K3 League. In the 2020 season, 16 teams are going to compete in the K3 League, and they are 8 teams from KNL, 6 teams from K3 League Advanced, and 2 teams from K3 League Basic. The teams for the 2020 season were announced by the Korea Football Association on 19 December 2019.

Competition format 
16 teams will compete in the 2020 season, including all 8 teams from the 2019 edition of the now-defunct Korea National League, six teams from the 2019 K3 League Advanced, and two teams from the 2019 K3 League Basic. Each team will play 22 games this season, 15 games in a round-robin way and 7 games in a split division. No team will be promoted to K League 2 this year. The 15th and 16th teams are to be relegated to K4 League, and the 14th team will qualify for the promotion/relegation playoff.

Teams

Foreign players

League table

Results

Matches 1-15

Matches 16-22
After 15 matches, the league splits into two sections of eight teams each, with teams playing every other team in their section once (either at home or away). The exact matches are determined upon the league table at the time of the split.

Final A

Final B

Championship play-off
Championship Play-off start at 14 November to Final at 5 December. If scores are tied after regular time, the higher placed team advances to the next phase.

1R

Gangneung City advance to the next round as they are the higher seed.

2R

Final
1st;

2nd;

Promotion–relegation play-off
Promotion–relegation play-off start at 6 December. The 14th position of K3 League will face winner of K4 League play-off for reach promotion to K3 League next season.

14th of K3 League vs K4

Winner

See also
 2020 Korean FA Cup
 2020 K League 1
 2020 K League 2
 2020 K4 League
 2020 K5 League
 2020 K6 League
 2020 K7 League

References

K3 League seasons
2020 in South Korean football